Rimbachia is a genus of fungi in the family Tricholomataceae. The genus contains about ten species with a widespread distribution in tropical regions.

The genus name of Rimbachia is in honour of August Rimbach (1862–1943), who was a German botanist (Bryology). He was between 1910-1919, Professor of Botany at the Agronomic Institute in Montevideo, Uruguay. 
 
The genus was circumscribed by Narcisse Théophile Patouillard in  Bull. Soc. Mycol. France vol.7 on page 159 in 1891.

Species 
As accepted by Species Fungorum;
 Rimbachia arachnoidea Redhead 1984
 Rimbachia bryophila Redhead 1984
 Rimbachia camerunensis Henn. 1901
 Rimbachia ellipsoidea Redhead 1984
 Rimbachia furfuracea Redhead 1984
 Rimbachia leucobryi Miettinen 2010
 Rimbachia neckerae Redhead 1984
 Rimbachia palmigena Singer 1966
 Rimbachia paludosa Redhead 1984
 Rimbachia paradoxa Pat. 1891
 Rimbachia philippensis Lloyd 1919
 Rimbachia spadicea Lloyd 1922

Former species;
 R. cyphelloides  = Rhodoarrhenia cyphelloides Bolbitiaceae
 R. pezizoidea  = Rhodoarrhenia pezizoidea Bolbitiaceae
 R. puiggarii  = Calyptella puiggarii Agaricales
 R. spathularia  = Skepperiella spathularia Agaricales
 R. vitellina  = Rhodoarrhenia vitellina Bolbitiaceae

See also

List of Tricholomataceae genera

References

External links

Tricholomataceae
Agaricales genera